Religion in the Bahamas is dominated by various Christian denominations and reflects the country's diversity. Since the English colonization, most Bahamians adhere to diverse Protestant denominations with Baptist churches/Evangelicals, Pentecostalism, Adventism and Methodism being at the forefront. There is no state religion in the Bahamas, and there is generally free practice of religious beliefs.

Demographics 
Statistically speaking, major Protestant denominations include Baptists/Evangelicals (35%), Anglicans (15%), Pentecostals (13%), Seventh-day Adventists (5%), and Methodists (4%).  Although many unaffiliated Protestant congregations are almost exclusively black, most mainstream churches are integrated racially. There are significant Roman Catholic (14 percent) and Greek Orthodox populations. Smaller Jewish, Baháʼí, Jehovah's Witness and Muslim communities also are active. A small number of Bahamians and Haitians, particularly those living in the Family Islands, practice Obeah, a form of African shamanism. A small number of citizens identify themselves as Rastafarians. Some members of the small resident Guyanese and Indian populations practice Hinduism and other South Asian religions.

More than 91 percent of the population of the Bahamas professes a religion, and anecdotal evidence suggests that most attend services regularly.

Religious freedom 

The constitution of the Bahamas provides for the freedom of religion and prohibits discrimination based on belief. The country has no state religion, although the preamble to its constitution mentions "Christian values".

Obeah is illegal in the Bahamas, punishable by a jail sentence. This law, however, is traditionally unenforced. Similarly, laws prohibiting the publication of blasphemy (with exceptions for opinions "expressed in good faith and in decent language") are also unenforced.

As of 2017, there have been no reports of significant societal breaches or abuses of the freedom of religion in the Bahamas according to the United States Department of State.

See also
Diocese of The Bahamas and the Turks and Caicos Islands
Hinduism in the West Indies
Religion in Jamaica
Religion in Trinidad and Tobago
Roman Catholicism in the Bahamas

References

Further reading